Mongolia Super Cup is an annual football match in Mongolia, played between the winners of the Mongolia Premier League and the MFF Cup.

List of finals
2011: Erchim 2–1 FC Ulaanbaatar
2012: Erchim 7–2 Khasiin Khulguud
2013: Erchim 2–1 Khangarid FC
2014: Erchim bt Khoromkhon FC
2015: Erchim 6–0 FC Ulaanbaatar
2016: Not played, moved from end of season to start of next season
2017: Ulaanbaatar City FC 4–2 Erchim
2018: Erchim 4–2 Athletic 220
2019: Erchim 4–0 Ulaanbaatar City FC
2020: FC Ulaanbaatar 2–0 Athletic 220
2021: Not held because of the COVID-19 pandemic
2022 March: Deren 2–0 Athletic 220
2022 August: Erchim 1-1 pso (3-2) FC Ulaanbaatar
2023 Tuv Buganuud FC

References

External links
Mongolia super cup - Soccerway

Football competitions in Mongolia
Mongolia